MSW/LFG stands for municipal solid waste and landfill gas. The United States Environmental Protection Agency has several standards required for MSW landfills to help ensure public and environmental safety.

See also
List of waste management acronyms

External links 
US EPA Waste
US EPA

Landfill

de:Deponiegas
pl:Gaz wysypiskowy